Mount Brading is a mountain topped by a snow peak,  east of the northeast corner of Larsen Inlet in Graham Land. It was surveyed by the Falkland Islands Dependencies Survey (FIDS) (1960–61) and named after Christopher G. Brading, a FIDS surveyor at Hope Bay (1959–60), who, with I. Hampton, R. Harbour, and J. Winham, made the first ascent of this mountain.

References 

Mountains of Graham Land
Nordenskjöld Coast